Leucosphaera is a genus of flowering plants belonging to the family Amaranthaceae.

Its native range is Southern Tropical and Southern Africa.

Species:
 Leucosphaera bainesii (Hook.f.) Gilg

References

Amaranthaceae
Amaranthaceae genera